Tiranga TV was a short-lived Indian English language television news channel. It went on air on 26 January 2019 using Harvest TV name. It was broadcast by Veecon Media and Broadcasting Pvt Ltd which runs another channel named Kaatyayani too according to Ministry of Information and Broadcasting (India).

Since the election results on 23 May 2019, payments of the employees have been stopped and from 16 July 2019, it has stopped providing any live content and news management closure by September 2019.

Senior journalist Barkha Dutt has lambasted its promoter Kapil Sibal over non-payment of dues and acrimoniously firing its 200 employees without any notice or severance package.

See also
 Media in India
 List of news channels in India

References

External links
 
Tiranga TV's employees sacked

Television channels and stations established in 2019
Television channels and stations disestablished in 2019